Tyrunn Walker (born March 18, 1990) is a former American football nose tackle. He played college football at Tulsa and signed with the New Orleans Saints as an undrafted free agent in 2012. He has also played for the Detroit Lions, Los Angeles Rams, and Buffalo Bills.

College career
Walker played college football at Jones County Junior College before transferring to the University of Tulsa for his junior season. In his two seasons at Tulsa, he finished with 84 tackles, 13.5 sacks, 11 pass deflections, and 4 forced fumbles.

Professional career

New Orleans Saints
On April 30, 2012, he signed with the New Orleans Saints as an undrafted free agent. Against the odds, Walker made the final 53-man roster.  However, he was a healthy inactive or did not play in all 16 of the team's regular season games. 

The next year, Walker played in seven games and recorded nine tackles, one sack, and one pass defensed. 

In the 2014 season, Walker played all 16 games, starting one, and tallied 19 tackles, 2.5 sacks, and one forced fumble.

Detroit Lions
On March 12, 2015, Walker signed a one-year contract with the Detroit Lions. During the 2015 season, he played in four games for Detroit and posted nine tackles before he suffered a broken fibula in a game on October 5 of that year and was placed on the injured reserve list for the remainder of the season. On March 4, 2016, the Lions re-signed Walker to a one-year contract. During the 2016 regular season, Walker played in 15 games, starting eight. He was involved in an unusual play during a Week 9 game against the Minnesota Vikings when he batted a Sam Bradford pass back to the quarterback Bradford, who caught the ball and ran for a five-yard gain. Walker finished the season with 26 tackles and one fumble recovered as the Lions made the playoffs. Walker recorded one tackle in the Lions' wild-card round game as they lost to the Seattle Seahawks by a score of 26-6.

Los Angeles Rams
On March 23, 2017, Walker signed with the Los Angeles Rams. He was released on June 22, 2017, but re-signed with the Rams on August 23, 2017. During the 2017 season, Walker played in 16 games, starting four, and recorded 22 tackles, four passes defensed, one forced fumble, one fumble recovery, and one sack as the Rams made the playoffs. Walker recorded three tackles in the Rams' wild-card round game as they lost to the Atlanta Falcons by a score of 26-13.

Buffalo Bills
On August 12, 2018, Walker was signed by the Buffalo Bills. He was released on September 1, 2018.

New Orleans Saints (second stint)
On January 15, 2019, Walker was signed by the New Orleans Saints after defensive tackle Sheldon Rankins was injured during a playoff game against the Philadelphia Eagles. He was listed as inactive for their next game, a loss to the Rams in the NFC Championship Game.

References

External links

Tulsa Hurricane bio 
New Orleans Saints bio

1990 births
Living people
People from New Iberia, Louisiana
American football defensive tackles
Jones County Bobcats football players
Players of American football from Louisiana
American football defensive ends
Tulsa Golden Hurricane football players
Detroit Lions players
Los Angeles Rams players
New Orleans Saints players
Buffalo Bills players